David Brynmor Williams  (born 29 October 1951) is a Welsh dual-code international rugby union, and professional rugby league footballer.

Williams was born in Cardigan, and was educated at Ysgol Gynradd Penparc, Cardigan Grammar School
and Cardiff College of Education. He is the elder brother of another top rugby player, Gwynfor Williams. His sons, Lloyd and Tom, are professional rugby players.

Williams' rugby union international and club appearances were limited by the presence of first Gareth Edwards, and then Terry Holmes in the same teams. He was capped three times for Wales (RU), and three times for the British Lions (RU).

In 1977 he toured New Zealand with the British and Irish Lions when he had yet to be capped by Wales. He made his international début in the first test of the series against the All Blacks at Athletic Park, Wellington, in June 1977 and went on to play in the first three tests before being replaced due to injury during the third match.

He made his Wales début against Australia at Ballymore, Brisbane in June 1978 and scored a try on his début. His only two other appearances for Wales came in the 1981 Five Nations championship.

Williams played club rugby for Cardiff RFC, Swansea RFC and Newport RFC.

Williams is Welsh-speaking and is sometimes called upon as a pundit in the Welsh-language media. In 2016 Williams took up the voluntary role as Chair of Fields in Trust Cymru, a charity dedicated to protecting outdoor space for play, sport and recreation.

Williams was appointed Member of the Order of the British Empire (MBE) in the 2022 Birthday Honours for services to sport and charity in Wales.

International honours
Brynmor Williams won a cap for Wales (RL) while at Cardiff City Blue Dragons 1982 1-cap 1-try 3-points.

Note
Before the start of the 1984/85 season, Cardiff City Blue Dragons relocated from Ninian Park in Cardiff, to Coychurch Road Ground in Bridgend, and were renamed Bridgend Blue Dragons.

References

1951 births
Living people
Barbarian F.C. players
British & Irish Lions rugby union players from Wales
Cardiff City Blue Dragons players
Cardiff RFC players
Dual-code rugby internationals
Newport RFC players
Rugby league halfbacks
Rugby league players from Ceredigion
Rugby union fly-halves
Rugby union players from Cardigan
Swansea RFC players
Wales international rugby union players
Wales national rugby league team players
Welsh rugby league players
Welsh rugby union players
Welsh-language broadcasters
Members of the Order of the British Empire